The railway from Épinay-Villetaneuse to Le Tréport-Mers is a French 173-kilometre long railway line, that connects Paris to Le Tréport on the English Channel coast. It was opened in several stages between 1872 and 1877.

Route
The Épinay-Villetaneuse–Le Tréport-Mers railway begins near the Épinay-Villetaneuse station, where it branches off the railway from Paris to Pontoise. It winds in generally northern direction to the Montsoult-Maffliers station, where the line to Luzarches branches off. It crosses the river Oise in Persan, and continues in northwestern direction towards Beauvais. It passes through Abancourt. From Aumale it follows the river Bresle downstream until it reaches its terminus Le Tréport-Mers station, near the beach resort towns Le Tréport and Mers-les-Bains.

Main stations

The main stations on the Épinay-Villetaneuse–Le Tréport-Mers railway are:
 Épinay-Villetaneuse station
 Persan-Beaumont station
 Beauvais station
 Abancourt station
 Le Tréport-Mers station

Services
The Épinay-Villetaneuse–Le Tréport-Mers railway is used by the following passenger services:
Transilien regional services from Paris to Persan-Beaumont and to Luzarches
TER Hauts-de-France regional services on the whole line

References

External links
TER Hauts-de-France railway map

Railway lines in Île-de-France
Railway lines in Hauts-de-France
Railway lines in Normandy
Standard gauge railways in France
Railway lines opened in 1872